The McMinnville Opera House, also known as Hawchins Opera House, was a landmark structure in McMinnville, Tennessee, that was destroyed by fire in 2008.

Built in September 1888, by African American entrepreneur William Hawchins. The building had businesses on the first floor, the main opera house on the second, and Mr. Hawchins' apartment on the third. The building was beautifully decorated with many ornaments, and a metropolitan opera house look for its time. This building helped the growth of McMinnville, making the town become known as a "Cultural Center".

20th century
The opera house eventually went as the times went on, therefore, citizens tore off the exterior Victorian ornaments off the building turning the building into shops. Later in the 20th century, the building served as King's Department Store.

Restoration
In 2004, the City of McMinnville decided to bring back the old charm of downtown McMinnville. The State of Tennessee Downtown Historical Preservation Society gave each county in the state to revive its downtown. The city went with the idea and started the "Revitalization of Historical Downtown McMinnville Project." The project was completed in 2006.

With that came the idea to restore the buildings of downtown. Many were left as they were, tidied up, and turned into shops. Many did not succeed. But there were a few that did: The New York Grill, Capalano's (Cap's), Highland Rim Music, and many antique shops. The rest of the abandoned buildings were either put up for rent or were scheduled for renovations, many of which are still occurring today. The McMinnville Opera House was one of many to be chosen to be renovated. The Dixon's were ready to go ahead and renovate the total building. The second floor had previously been renovated 15 years before into a Townhouse carefully restoring the solid wood floors and exposing the brick walls. The street level was undergoing a total facelift preserving the cabinets and oak flooring.  Showcases displaying McMinnville memorabilia as well as Civil War, World War II, and Vietnam War items of local interest were on display. A study area for research was set aside for public use.  The museum was a surprise gift to McMinnville and is scheduled to open July 5, which is the set date for the Bicentennial Celebration for the county. Veterans of many eras had donated their personal items for this purpose.

Destructive fire
On Saturday, March 29, 2008, at around midnight, the building was destroyed by a fire. 
On June 15, 2008, the Southern Standard reported that the cause of the fire had been arson. The Dixons, the building owners, had several reports of suspected vandalism and had installed cameras around their building. Though they had a few young people smoking in the back, they didn't assume that that was the cause of the fire. There were no leads on the identity of the arsonist(s).

References

Event venues established in 1888
Music venues completed in 1888
Former theatres in the United States
Theatres in Tennessee
Buildings and structures in Warren County, Tennessee
Buildings and structures in the United States destroyed by arson
Arson in Tennessee